Little Pine Creek is a tributary of Pine Creek in Luzerne County and Columbia County, in Pennsylvania, in the United States. A number of bridges have been built over the creek and a fulling mill historically existed on it. The creek is inhabited by wild trout.

Course
Little Pine Creek begins in Bear Swamp in northwestern Huntington Township, Luzerne County. It flows south-southeast for several tenths of a mile, crossing Pennsylvania Route 239 and passing through a pond. The creek enters New Columbus and continues flowing roughly due south, getting progressively closer to the border between Luzerne County and Columbia County over the next mile or two (two or three kilometers). It receives two unnamed tributaries in this stretch before exiting New Columbus and Luzerne County.

Upon exiting Luzerne County, Little Pine Creek enters Fishing Creek Township, Columbia County. The creek flows south for a few tenths of a mile before briefly turning east-southeast and then turning south. After some distance, it turns east for a short distance and then turns southwest. After crossing Bendertown Road, the creek turns south-southeast and then curves eastwards for several tenths of a mile until it reaches its confluence with Pine Creek.

Geography and watershed

Both the mouth and the source of the creek is in the USGS Stillwater 7.5 minute quadrangle.

History

Little Pine Creek was added to the Geographic Names Information System on August 2, 1979. Its identifier in the Geographic Names Information System is 1179634.

A man by the name of Kennedy constructed a small fulling mill on Little Pine Creek in 1820. However, it was not operational for a long period of time. Little Pine Creek was designated as a public "highway" (i.e. waterway) from its mouth in Columbia County to New Columbus in Luzerne County on April 4, 1837. The Water Supply Commission of Pennsylvania approved the construction of a bridge carrying the Bendertown-Shickshinny Road over the creek by 1915.

A prestressed box beam bridge was built over Little Pine Creek in Columbia County in 1998. A masonry arch bridge was built over the creek in Luzerne County in 1927. A bridge in Fishing Creek Township was built over the creek in 1915.

Biology
Wild trout naturally reproduce in Little Pine Creek. The creek is on the Pennsylvania Fish and Boat Commission's list of wild trout streams.

See also
List of tributaries of Fishing Creek (North Branch Susquehanna River)

References

External links
Bridge over Little Pine Creek

Rivers of Luzerne County, Pennsylvania
Rivers of Columbia County, Pennsylvania
Tributaries of Fishing Creek (North Branch Susquehanna River)
Rivers of Pennsylvania